The Nigeria women's national basketball team, also known as D'Tigeress, represents Nigeria in international women's basketball competition, and are regulated by the Nigeria Basketball Federation, the governing body for basketball in Nigeria. Nigeria has one of the most successful women's national teams on the African Continent, being the current African champions. They have won the Women's Afrobasket Championship consecutively for three times in a roll. They won in 2017 at Bamako, Mali, 2019 at Dakar, Senegal and in the year 2021 at Yaounder, Cameroun.

History

2004 Summer Olympics
The Nigerians competed at the 2004 Summer Olympics in basketball, one of ten events their national teams qualified for. The Nigerian women's basketball team was one of the twelve teams competing in the event. They earned their berth through a zone qualifying tournament and played in Group A along with Australia, Brazil, Greece, Japan, and Russia. The team went 0–5 in the preliminary round. In the 11/12th place game, they defeated the Korea for a final finish of 11th out of 12 teams. With this win, they became the first women's African basketball team to win a game at the Olympics.

Mfon Udoka was the team's leading scorer and the tournament's second highest scorer. Team athletes Itoro Umoh-Coleman and Joanne Aluka both played high school basketball at Hephzibah High School prior to playing together for Nigeria.

2006 FIBA World Championship for Women
Nigeria qualified for the 2006 FIBA World Championship by winning the 2005 FIBA Africa Championship for Women. They were placed into Group C with China, Russia, and the United States. Nigeria did not qualify for a pass into the second round and were defeated in the 15/16th place game by fellow African representatives Senegal by a score of 66–64. Their tournament record was 0–5.

Nigeria also participated in the 2006 Commonwealth Games held in Melbourne, Australia.

Team in 2007
The team attended the FIBA Africa Championship for Women 2007; the qualifying event for African teams attempting to make the 2008 Summer Olympics. Nigeria made it to the quarterfinals of the 2007 FIBA African Championship before losing to Mozambique 69–61. They won fifth place by defeating Cameroon 63–50. The team did not qualify for the Beijing Olympic Games.

The Nigerian squad went undefeated in group play during the 2007 All-Africa Games. They went on to the semi-finals and lost to Mozambique 57–46.

2009 Nations Cup
Nigeria has qualified for the 2009 Africa Cup of Nations (basketball) to be held in Libya.

Competitive record

FIBA World Cup

Summer Olympics

AfroBasket Women

Team honours and achievements
Intercontinental
FIBA Women's Basketball World Cup
Quarterfinals: 2018
Continental
AfroBasket Women
Gold Medal:  2003,  2005,  2017  2019  2021
Bronze Medal:  1997,  2015
All Africa Games
Gold Medal:  2003
Silver Medal:  2007,  2015
Bronze Medal:  1995,  1978,  1999,  2011

Team

Current roster
Roster for the 2021 Women's Afrobasket.

2020 Olympic roster

Former players and coaches
This is a list of former players and coaches, as well as current players who have played on past squads, with their years on the team indicated by the Nigerian flag beneath a given year.

*Olympic games attended by the squad indicated in this year.

See also
Nigeria women's national under-19 basketball team
Nigeria women's national under-17 basketball team
Nigeria women's national 3x3 team

References

External links

FIBA profile
Nigeria Basketball Records at FIBA Archive
Afrobasket – Nigeria Women National Team

Women's
Women's national basketball teams
Basketball